Courageux was a 74-gun ship of the line of the French Navy, lead ship of a two-ship sub-type of the  that also comprised .

She was started as Alcide, and renamed in 1802. She was commissioned on 8 April 1806 under Amable Troude.

Fate
She was broken up in 1831.

Sources and references

Ships of the line of the French Navy
1806 ships